Dezful Airport is located on Andimeshk road in the city of Dezful, Iran.

Airlines and Destinations

Military
Dezful Airport is also known as Vahdati Air Base, with military operations conducted by the Iran Air Force.

External links
Vahdati Air Base GlobalSecurity article

References

Iranian airbases
Buildings and structures in Khuzestan Province
Airports in Iran
Transportation in Khuzestan Province